Kevin Parker (born March 6, 1967) is an American politician from the state of New York. He is a member of the New York State Senate representing the 21st district, which comprises portions of the Brooklyn neighborhoods of East Flatbush, Flatbush, Midwood, Ditmas Park, Kensington, Park Slope, and Windsor Terrace. A Democrat, Parker was first elected to the Senate in 2002.

Parker is known for his angry outbursts, some of which have been violent. In 2010, he was convicted by a jury of two counts of criminal mischief for attacking a New York Post photographer, damaging the photographer's camera and car door, and breaking the photographer's finger.

Education and early career 
Parker is the son of Sonie and Georgie Parker. He attended P.S. 193, Andries Hudde I.S. 240, and Midwood High School in Brooklyn, New York. Walker received a Bachelor of Science degree in Public Service from Penn State.

Prior to serving in elected office, Parker held a number of different public sector roles, including intergovernmental aide to New York State Comptroller H. Carl McCall and New York City Urban Fellow under Manhattan Borough President and mayoral candidate Ruth Messinger.

In 2001, Parker ran unsuccessfully in the New York City Council District 45 Democratic primary, coming in fifth with 14.95% of the vote.

New York State Senate

Elections 
In 2002, Parker defeated former City Councilman Noach Dear in a tightly contested Democratic primary for a newly drawn, open State Senate seat in Brooklyn. He won the 2002 general election and was elected to the Senate for the first time.

In the 2008 Democratic primary, Parker held off a strong challenge from New York City Councilmembers Simcha Felder and Kendall Stewart. He won the primary with less than 50% of the vote. In 2008, the district was about 60% black, 22% white, and 10% Hispanic. In 2012, Parker's district was redrawn, and remained a majority African American district.

Tenure
On June 24, 2011, the State Senate passed the Marriage Equality Act. Parker voted in favor of the legislation, which was signed into law that evening. However, he stormed to the podium where Lt. Gov. Robert Duffy was presiding and then left the Senate floor in protest because he was not allowed to speak on the bill. According to Parker, Senate Democrats had previously been informed that each Senator would have two minutes to explain his or her vote. Parker added that the doors to the Senate chamber were locked on the evening of June 24 to prevent senators from leaving the chamber when the bill was voted upon.

After Democrats won the Senate majority in the 2018 elections, Parker was named Chair of the Committee on Energy and Telecommunications. As of March 2019, Parker served as Majority Whip. The State Senate passed the Reproductive Health Act in 2019, with Parker voting in favor of the bill; Governor Andrew Cuomo signed the bill into law. In May 2019, the State Senate passed a Parker-sponsored bill that would ban undetectable firearms.

A Parker-sponsored bill that barred utility companies from shutting off customers' service during the COVID-19 pandemic and other states of emergency was signed into law on June 17, 2020. On October 14, 2020, a Parker-sponsored bill recognizing Juneteenth (June 19) as an official state holiday was enacted, commemorating the day when the news of liberation came to Texas more than two years after President Abraham Lincoln’s Emancipation Proclamation went into effect. Also in 2020, he sponsored a bill that would have recognized racism as a public health crisis.

In 2021, Parker re-introduced legislation to require members of the NYPD to live in the five boroughs.

2021 NYC Comptroller campaign 

Parker announced his candidacy in the 2021 New York City Comptroller election. He ran in the Democratic primary against (among others) NYS Senator Brian Benjamin, entrepreneur and former US Marine Zach Iscol, NYC Council member Brad Lander, and NYS Assemblymember David Weprin. Through January 15, 2021, he was fifth in fundraising among all candidates, behind Lander, Iscol, Benjamin, and Weprin. He had raised approximately $122,000. Parker finished sixth in the Democratic primary, which was won by Lander.

Controversies, altercations, and legal troubles 
Parker is notable for what City & State NY referred to in 2019 as his "long history of making explosive remarks and getting involved in scuffles".

2004-09
In 2004, businessman and politician Wellington Sharpe, who once ran against Parker, said that Parker had assaulted him in an argument. Sharpe did not file any charges. Parker defeated Sharpe in the 2004 election.

In January 2005, Parker was arrested, taken to the 67th Precinct station, and charged with third degree assault for punching a New York City traffic agent in the face after Parker saw the traffic agent writing his car a traffic citation for double parking. The charges were dropped as part of a plea deal after he agreed to take anger management classes.

In 2005, a female staffer alleged that Parker had hit and shoved her while she was working for him as an office manager. She further alleged that after she made these accusations public, Parker had threatened her at a restaurant.

A 32-year-old female special assistant to Parker filed charges with the police at the 70th Precinct against him in 2008. She alleged that he pushed her during an argument, choked her, knocked her eyeglasses off her face, and then intentionally smashed her glasses by stomping on them.

2010-present
Parker was convicted of misdemeanor charges of criminal mischief in 2010. On May 8, 2009, Parker was arrested and charged with felony criminal mischief, assault, and menacing in Brooklyn for chasing and attacking a New York Post photographer, damaging the photographer's camera and car door, and breaking his finger.  Parker was taken to the 67th Police Precinct station, booked, charged with a felony due to the value of damage to the camera and car door, and released without bail. As a result, he was stripped of his leadership positions as Majority Whip and chair of the Energy Committee, and payment of his $22,000 leadership stipend was suspended. Parker was convicted by a jury of two misdemeanor charges of criminal mischief on December 6, 2010. On March 21, 2011, Parker was sentenced to three years' probation, fined $1,000, and ordered to pay compensation to the newspaper. He was ordered again to attend anger-management classes; the judge also issued an order of protection against Parker on behalf of the photographer. Meanwhile, Parker told reporters: "I don't think I have an anger issue."

Parker was restrained by colleagues during a profane tirade against Senator Diane Savino in February 2010. During the tirade, Parker referred to Savino as a "bitch". He then offered to fight her boyfriend, Senator Jeff Klein, who intervened.

In April 2010, Parker launched into a tirade while white colleague John DeFrancisco of Syracuse was questioning a black nominee for the New York State Power Authority at a confirmation hearing. Parker objected to DeFrancisco's questions and asserted that he had never seen a white nominee treated in similar fashion. "Amid the nearly two-minute tirade, committee chairman Carl Kruger told Parker he would be removed from the hearing room if he didn't settle down". Parker responded: "Well, you better bring people". During the tirade, Parker accused his colleagues of racism. He followed up in a radio interview by accusing DeFrancisco and Parker's Republican "enemies" of being white supremacists, but later apologized for the "white supremacists" accusation.  His fellow Democrat, Senator Rubén Díaz Sr., himself a racial minority, opined that Parker "needs help". The New York Times editorial board, writing that Parker was "known as the man with frightening rages that could erupt at any time and on almost any subject," opined that "Mr. Parker should be censured, and voters in central Brooklyn should start recruiting a qualified replacement."

In December 2018, a car bearing Parker's official Senate parking placard was parked illegally  in a New York City bicycle lane, blocking bicycle traffic. When questioned by a female staffer about the vehicle on Twitter, Parker replied, "Kill yourself!" Incoming Senate President Andrea Stewart-Cousins expressed her "disappointment" at Parker's action, and Lt. Gov. Kathy Hochul said it was "wildly inappropriate". Parker said: "I don't know why this is a temper issue. Did I touch her?" He also said: "I’m sure people in my district don’t care." As of January 27, 2019, no formal disciplinary action had been taken against Parker in regard to the "Kill yourself!" tweet.

In an April 2019 closed-door meeting of Senate Democrats, an argument between Parker and freshman Senator Alessandra Biaggi occurred. Parker reportedly "ripped off his tie and threw it down in a rage".

References

External links

New York State Senate: Kevin S. Parker
New York State Senator Kevin Parker Official website.

 "Parker Slams Sharpe", Courier Life Newspapers.

Living people
Graduate Center, CUNY alumni
Pennsylvania State University alumni
The New School alumni
Democratic Party New York (state) state senators
African-American state legislators in New York (state)
Midwood High School alumni
1967 births
New York (state) politicians convicted of crimes
21st-century American politicians
Politicians from Brooklyn
Brooklyn College faculty
Candidates in the 2021 United States elections
21st-century African-American politicians
20th-century African-American people